North Ridgeville is a city located along the eastern border of Lorain County, Ohio. The city's population was 35,280 in 2020. North Ridgeville is the fastest-growing city in northern Ohio. It has been ranked the 13th safest city in the United States and the safest in Ohio.

North Ridgeville is home to a 350,000 square foot Riddell production and distribution center, where National Football League and NCAA helmets and pads are produced. It is also home to a campus of Lorain County Community College and a branch of University Hospitals Cleveland Medical Center.

History
The first settlement of what is now North Ridgeville was made in 1810. The village was named for a ridge near the original town site.

On the National Register of Historic Places
North Ridgeville Olde Towne Hall 36119 Center Ridge Rd., North Ridgeville
Cahoon, Samuel C., House (added 1978) 38369 Center Ridge Rd., North Ridgeville

Geography
North Ridgeville is located in North East Ohio at  (41.389546, -82.004605).

Located in eastern Lorain County, it borders the following municipalities and townships:
Avon, Lorain County - north
Westlake, Cuyahoga County - northeast
North Olmsted, Cuyahoga County - east
Olmsted Township, Cuyahoga County - southeast
Columbia Township, Lorain County - southeast corner
Eaton Township, Lorain County - south
Elyria, Lorain County - west
Sheffield, Lorain County - northwest corner

Metropolitan Area
North Ridgeville, is a part of the Cleveland-Elyria-Mentor Metropolitan Statistical Area which in 2010 had a population of 2,077,240. North Ridgeville is also part of the larger Cleveland-Akron-Elyria Combined Statistical Area, which in 2010 had a population of 2,780,440.

Zip code
The city of North Ridgeville has a post office, with the zip code of 44039. This zip code covers most of the city. Some sections of the city use zip codes 44035, 44011 and 44044. And in the 2000s, zip code 44039 was expanded outside of the city limits along highway 10 into Eaton, and Carlisle Townships..

Area code
In the 1950s, AT&T assigned North Ridgeville and Northeast Ohio the 216 area code. In 1996, Northeast Ohio was divided into two area codes. Area code 216 was reduced in size to cover the northern half of its prior area, centering on Cleveland and its lake shore suburbs. Area code 330 was introduced for remaining outlying areas formerly covered by area code 216, including Akron, Brunswick, Canton, Medina, Warren and Youngstown.

 List of exchanges from AreaCodeDownload.com, 440 Area Code

Demographics

2000 census
As of the census of 2000, there were 22,338 people, 8,356 households, and 6,434 families residing in the city. The population density was 369.1/km2 (955.8/mi2). There were 8,587 housing units at an average density of 141.9/km2 (367.4/mi2). The racial makeup of the city was 96.36% White, 0.86% African American, 0.21% Native American, 0.92% Asian, 0.49% from other races, and 1.15% from two or more races. Hispanic or Latino of any race were 1.99% of the population.

There were 8,356 households, out of which 32.9% had children under the age of 18 living with them, 65.1% were married couples living together, 8.5% had a female householder with no husband present, and 23.0% were non-families. 19.4% of all households were made up of individuals, and 6.5% had someone living alone who was 65 years of age or older. The average household size was 2.65 and the average family size was 3.05.

In the city the population was spread out, with 24.4% under the age of 18, 7.0% from 18 to 24, 30.6% from 25 to 44, 27.3% from 45 to 64, and 10.7% who were 65 years of age or older. The median age was 38 years. For every 100 females, there were 96.4 males. For every 100 females age 18 and over, there were 93.6 males.

The median income for a household in the city was $54,482, and the median income for a family was $61,621. Males had a median income of $42,634 versus $27,379 for females. The per capita income for the city was $22,971. About 2.3% of families and 3.2% of the population were below the poverty line, including 4.2% of those under age 18 and 5.0% of those age 65 or over.

2010 census
As of the census of 2010, there were 29,465 people, 11,500 households, and 8,486 families residing in the city. The racial makeup of the city was 95.0% White, 1.5% African American, 0.2% Native American, 1.2% Asian, 0.6% from other races, and 1.6% from two or more races. Hispanic or Latino of any race were 3.3% of the population.

There were 11,500 households, of which 32.1% had children under the age of 18 living with them, 61.3% were married couples living together, 8.6% had a female householder with no husband present, 3.9% had a male householder with no wife present, and 26.2% were non-families. 21.9% of all households were made up of individuals, and 8.4% had someone living alone who was 65 years of age or older. The average household size was 2.54 and the average family size was 2.97.

The median age in the city was 40.7 years. 23.1% of residents were under the age of 18; 5.9% were between the ages of 18 and 24; 27.1% were from 25 to 44; 28.9% were from 45 to 64; and 15% were 65 years of age or older. The gender makeup of the city was 49.1% male and 50.9% female.

Education 
North Ridgeville has a public library, a branch of the Lorain Public Library.

Public schools 
The North Ridgeville City School District is managed by a directly elected school board. The North Ridgeville City School District was given a mediocre report card by the Ohio Department of Education for the years 2015–16. It had a grade of F for "Gap Closing" as well as "K-3 Literacy", while receiving a B for "Graduation Rate".

Public primary and intermediate schools include:
Early Childhood Learning Community, on Mills Creek Ln. (Pre-K thru K)
Liberty School, on Jaycox Rd. (1-2)
North Ridgeville Academic Center, on Bainbridge Rd. (3-8)

There is also the Ranger High Tech Academy for STEM students grades 2 through 7.

Public high schools include:
North Ridgeville High School (NRHS), on Bainbridge Road and Pitts Boulevard.
Lorain County Joint Vocational School, located in Oberlin, on Ohio State Highway 58 South.

North Ridgeville High School was named Ohio Lottery School of the Year for 2009–2010, and 2012–2013.

In November 2013, the citizens of North Ridgeville passed a bond issue for the replacement of the North Ridgeville Middle School, Elizabeth Wilcox Elementary, and the Rangers Stadium. The new Rangers Stadium was completed by mid-2016, the inaugural football game took place on September 2, 2016. The North Ridgeville Academic Center, for grades 3–8, and the new stadium has been constructed on the property adjacent to the current North Ridgeville High School, on Bainbridge Road. The old schools, and stadium are scheduled for demolition. The district has rearranged preexisting schools, taking the Early Childhood Learning Center out of commission, while replacing the roof on Liberty School.

Private schools 
Private schools include:
Saint Peter School, Grades K-8.
Lake Ridge Academy, Grades K-12.

Higher education 
Lorain County Community College, which is based in nearby Elyria, operates the University Partnership Ridge Campus in eastern North Ridgeville, adjacent to Interstate 480.

Transportation 
North Ridgeville is served by many highways, including I-80 (Ohio Turnpike), the Outerbelt South Freeway Interstate 480 (Ohio), U.S. Route 20, Ohio State Route 10, Ohio State Route 83, and Ohio State Route 113. And just minutes away from I-90, and Ohio State Route 2.

The airport for North Ridgeville is the Cleveland Hopkins International Airport (located in Cleveland, Ohio), and the Lorain County Regional Airport is the nearest county airport.

The Elyria, and Cleveland Amtrak Stations provide train transportation to the residents of North Ridgeville.

Arts and culture
In the June 2002 issue of Cleveland Magazine, the North Ridgeville Corn Festival was voted the best festival in Northeast Ohio.

North Ridgeville is home to the North Ridgeville Corn Festival. The history started when the Bicentennial Committee for the City of North Ridgeville was formed in 1975 to celebrate the upcoming United States bicentennial in 1976. The first festival ran 6 hours and featured 13 booths around the North Ridgeville Middle School track. The proceeds were donated to the library to assist with the cost of relocating it from the old Lawson's store area the Olde Town Hall building across the street. The next year, in 1976, in addition to celebrating the bicentennial, the festival was held in honor Harold Sweet, a sweet corn grower in North Ridgeville, for all that he did for the youth and citizens of the city. The proceeds from this festival were donated to purchase trees for the then new Bainbridge Extension along with 2 bicentennial flags for City Hall. The Bicentennial Committee was renamed the North Ridgeville Corn Festival Committee in 1977.

Shopping 
Avon Commons, Avon
Great Northern Mall
Crocker Park

Parks and recreation 
Sandy Ridge Reservation
South Central Park
Frontier Park
Palmer Field
Shady Drive Complex
Soccer Complex
Victory Park Ohio

Notable people
 Martin Mull, actor and musician known for of Clue, Roseanne ,and Dads.
 Charles O. Hobaugh, astronaut
 Don Pope, third place finisher in the 2006 World's Strongest Man competition
 Joe Charboneau, baseball player for the Cleveland Indians and 1980 American League Rookie of the Year
 Dav Pilkey, author of Dog Man and Captain Underpants

References

External links
 City website
 North Ridgeville Historical Society

Cities in Lorain County, Ohio
Cities in Ohio
1810 establishments in Ohio